Fuller brush man may refer to:

 Door-to-door salesmen for the Fuller Brush Company
 The Fuller Brush Man, a 1948 comedy film